Kim Thi is former district of Hải Hưng province. It was formed from merger of Kim Động and Ân Thi districts.

References 

Former districts of Vietnam